Afroditi Laoutari (1893–1975) was a famous Greek singer and actress in musical theatre.

She was born in Patras in 1893. By 1915, she was already performing lead roles with the company. From that date through the 1920s, she performed roles in many works of musical theatre, both foreign and especially, Greek operettas. She was a muse to composer and conductor Theophrastos Sakellaridis. By the early 1930s, she had retired from the theatre. She then became one of, if not the, first Greek radio announcers on Athens Radio Station (RCA) in 1938, where she was a dominating force. She continued to broadcast after the end of World War II for another decade. Sofia Vembo has been said to resemble Afroditi Laoutari at the height of her fame. She died in 1975.

Stage performances

Filmography
 Shattered Dreams (Γκρεμισμένα όνειρα) (1949)

Legacy 
Laoutari has been portrayed on stage in the operetta Remember Those Years (Θυμήσου εκείνα τα χρόνια) (2008), composed by musicologist Lambros Liavas as a tribute to Theophrastos Sakellaridis.

References

External links

Afroditi Laoutari singing 'Aurelia' from Diabolical child

1893 births
1975 deaths
Greek stage actresses
20th-century Greek women opera singers
Actors from Patras
Musicians from Patras